A  is a traditional tube-sleeved Japanese coat, usually worn only during festivals.  typically feature symbols and/or text on the lapels, with a larger design on the back of the coat, typically the name or the festival or the participating association; the kanji for  may also be present.

Firefighters also wore  coats, with the crest on the back of the coat displaying the group with which they were associated; these were distinct from the  also worn by firefighters, constructed from heavily-quilted cotton layers designed to hold a large quantity of water and thus protect the wearer. In the Edo period, firefighters were paid not only for actual firefighting activity but also for promptness and presence at the scene of a fire.

In English, the term  is most often translated as "happi coat" or "happy coat".  are typically blue, with designs in red, black, and white, though variations with a number of different colours are also seen in modern day Japan. Modern  coats may be made of cotton or polyester fabrics.

References

Japanese upper-body garments
Japanese words and phrases